Roslyakovo is the name of several rural localities in Russia:

Roslyakovo, Saratov Oblast, a village in Dukhovnitsky District of Saratov Oblast
Roslyakovo, Vologda Oblast, a village in Glushkovsky Selsoviet of Belozersky District in Vologda Oblast
Roslyakovo, Yaroslavl Oblast, a village in Lyutovsky Rural Okrug of Yaroslavsky District in Yaroslavl Oblast
Roslyakovo, Murmansk Oblast, a former urban-type settlement under the administrative jurisdiction of the closed administrative-territorial formation of Severomorsk in Murmansk Oblast; merged into the city of Murmansk in January 2015